Llandaff Oratory is an oratory in Van Reenen, KwaZulu-Natal, South Africa. The oratory was built by Maynard Mathews in memory of his son Llandaff Mathews who died while saving the lives of eight colleagues at the Burnside Colliery mine on 19 March 1925.

Initially, Maynard Mathews wanted to erect a plaque in honour of his son at the Roman Catholic Church in Ladysmith, but could not secure permission to do so. Determined that a memorial to his son should be placed in a church, Maynard decided to build his own, have it consecrated a Catholic church and become a priest himself (he was ordained in the Dominicans on 7 May 1926).

The oratory seats just eight people, apparently the same number of people Llandaff saved in the mine accident, and is architecturally based on a wing of Cardiff Cathedral in Wales.

The Oratory is a Heritage Landmark (formerly called a National Monument).

See also 
 Cardiff Cathedral

References 
 Verposing in klein kerkie met 'n groot hart, Beeld

Notes

External links 
 Entry on SAHRA, the South African Heritage Resources Agency

Roman Catholic chapels in South Africa
Monuments and memorials in South Africa
Buildings and structures in KwaZulu-Natal
South African heritage sites